Clavus auriculifera is a species of sea snail, a marine gastropod mollusk in the family Drilliidae.

This species needs further investigation (species inquirenda)

Description
The shell is white, with a broad chestnut band below the periphery. The  tuberculations of the periphery are often long, spinose. There is usually a
revolving row of nodules below the middle of the body whorl.

Distribution
This species occurs in the Indian Ocean along the Aldabra Atoll and in the Pacific Ocean along the Philippines.

References

 Taylor, J.D. (1973). Provisional list of the mollusca of Aldabra Atoll.

auriculifera